Qmusic TV is the digital television channel of Qmusic Flanders. The channel started broadcasting on February 20, 2012. On the channel live footage from the studio and Twitter updates are seen. During some songs music videos are shown. The channel can be received via Telenet and Yelo TV, but is also available online via the website of Qmusic. Through Stievie programs can be requested again for seven days after broadcast.

References

External links
 Official website 

Television channels in Belgium
Television channels and stations established in 2012
Vilvoorde